Adam Thomas (born 11 August 1988) is an English actor, known for his roles as Donte Charles in the BBC One school-based drama series Waterloo Road (2006–2009, 2023–present) and Adam Barton in the ITV soap opera Emmerdale (2009–2018).

Early life
Adam Gordon Thomas was born on 11 August 1988 in Salford, Greater Manchester, England. He is the twin brother of Scott Thomas, who appeared in Love Island in 2016 and the younger brother of Coronation Street actor Ryan Thomas. He is of English, Indian and Caribbean heritage.

Career

2002-2008
Thomas began his television career in 2002 with a guest appearance on the BBC daytime soap opera Doctors. It was another four years before Thomas launched to fame in his breakthrough role as Donte Charles in the BBC One school-based drama series Waterloo Road of which he was an original cast member upon its inception in 2006 until 2009. The role of Donte led Thomas to enjoy guest appearances in popular hospital drama Casualty in 2008 in which he played a boxer, as well as a second appearance in Doctors in 2007. He also appeared as himself on ITV gameshow All Star Family Fortunes alongside his older brother and fellow actor Ryan, who played Jason Grimshaw in the soap opera, Coronation Street.

2009-2019
Following his departure from Waterloo Road in 2009, Thomas signed on for his third appearance on daytime soap Doctors, this time playing a character called Ben Hamilton. The episode aired on 26 May 2009. It was announced on 21 May 2009 that Thomas had landed the role of Adam Barton in the long-running ITV soap opera, Emmerdale, and would appear on screens from July 2009. Thomas left Emmerdale in early 2018. In November and December 2016, Thomas was a contestant on the sixteenth series of I'm a Celebrity...Get Me Out of Here! and finished in third place. He became a property executive for the Kamani Property Group in 2018 alongside former Emmerdale co-star Marc Silcock. In February 2019, he portrayed the role of Rob in an episode of the BBC drama Moving On. On 19 October 2019, it was announced that Thomas would be co-hosting I'm a Celebrity: Extra Camp. In September 2019, Thomas opened a bar/restaurant with his school friend, Scott Graham.  The restaurant, named The Spinn was situated in Gatley, Stockport. In spite of numerous efforts by Thomas to maintain popularity (including, but not limited to a large billboard situated in Ancoats) The Spinn has since closed down. It is speculated that the closure was related to lack of business, or Thomas' historic and publicly documented alcoholism, with him resigning as director of the limited company as early as mid-2022.

2021-present
In late 2021 it was confirmed Thomas was returning to the role of Donte Charles in recommissioned return of Waterloo Road.

Personal life
In September 2014, Thomas and his long-term girlfriend, Caroline Daly, welcomed their first child, a son. On 27 August 2017, Adam and Caroline married in Delamere Manor, Cheshire. In December 2017, they announced they were expecting their second child in May 2018. The couple took part in All Star Mr & Mrs in August 2016. In August 2020, Thomas admitted that he and his twin have a drinking problem; he vowed to get sober like his brother who celebrated six months of sobriety at the time. 
Thomas is an ardent supporter of the Transgender rights movement, being spotted at an LGBT rights march in 2020 sporting rainbow coloured Spinn merchandise.

Filmography

Awards and nominations

See also
 List of I'm a Celebrity...Get Me Out of Here! (British TV series) contestants

References

External links

1988 births
Living people
British male actors of Indian descent
Male actors from Salford
English male soap opera actors
21st-century English male actors
English people of Indian descent
English people of Barbadian descent
I'm a Celebrity...Get Me Out of Here! (British TV series) participants